The 2021–22 Taça de Portugal (also known as Taça de Portugal Placard for sponsorship reasons) was the 82nd edition of the Taça de Portugal, the premier knockout competition in Portuguese football.
A total of 154 clubs competed in this edition, including all teams from the top four tiers of the Portuguese football league system – excluding reserve or B teams, which are not eligible – and representatives of the fifth-tier District leagues and cups.

The competition began on 9 September 2021 with the first-round matches involving teams from the third, fourth and fifth tiers, and concluded on 22 May 2022 with the final at the Estádio Nacional in Oeiras between top-tier sides Porto and Tondela.
Primeira Liga side and defending champions Braga were eliminated by Vizela in the fifth round. Porto beat Tondela 3–1 in the final to win their eighteenth title.

The winners qualify for the 2022–23 UEFA Europa League group stage and play the 2022 Supertaça Cândido de Oliveira against the 2021–22 Primeira Liga winners. As Porto secured qualification to the 2022–23 UEFA Champions League by league ranking, the cup winner's place in the Europa League was thus transferred to the league's fourth-placed team, Braga. Consequently, the league's fifth- and sixth-placed teams, Gil Vicente and Vitória de Guimarães, qualified instead for the 2022–23 UEFA Europa Conference League third and second qualifying rounds, respectively.
As Porto also won the league title, they will play the 2022 Supertaça match against the cup runners-up, Tondela.

Format

Teams 
A total of 154 teams compete in the 2021–22 edition, comprising 18 teams from the Liga Portugal Bwin (tier 1), 16 teams from the Liga Portugal SABSEG (tier 2), 21 teams from the Liga 3 (tier 3 ), 58 teams from the Campeonato de Portugal (tier 4) and 41 teams from the District championships and cups (tier 4).

Liga Portugal Bwin 

 Arouca
 Belenenses SAD
 Benfica
 Boavista
 Braga
 Estoril
 Famalicão
 Gil Vicente
 Marítimo

 Moreirense
 Paços de Ferreira
 Porto
 Portimonense
 Santa Clara
 Sporting CP
 Tondela
 Vitória de Guimarães
 Vizela

Liga Portugal SABSEG 

 Académica
 Académico de Viseu
 Casa Pia
 Chaves
 Estrela da Amadora
 Farense
 Feirense
 Leixões

 Mafra
 Nacional
 Penafiel
 Rio Ave
 Sp. Covilhã
 Trofense
 Varzim
 Vilafranquense

Liga 3 

Série A
 Anadia
 Canelas 2010
 Fafe
 Felgueiras
 Lusitânia Lourosa
 Montalegre
 Oliveirense
 Pevidém
 Sanjoanense
 São João de Ver

Série B
 Alverca
 Amora
 Caldas
 Cova da Piedade
 Oliveira do Hospital
 Oriental Dragon
 Real SC
 Torreense
 União de Leiria
 União de Santarém
 Vitória de Setúbal

Campeonato de Portugal 

Série A
 Camacha
 Câmara de Lobos
 Forjães
 Limianos
 Maria da Fonte
 Merelinense
 União da Madeira
 Vianense
 Vilaverdense

Série B
 Amarante
 Berço
 Macedo de Cavaleiros
 Mirandela
 Paredes
 Santa Marta de Penaguião
 São Martinho
 Tirsense
 Vila Meã
 Vila Real

Campeonato de Portugal

Série C
 Alvarenga
 Castro Daire
 Espinho
 Ferreira de Aves
 Gondomar
 Gouveia
 Leça
 Salgueiros
 União de Coimbra
 Valadares

Série D
 Benfica Castelo Branco
 Condeixa
 Fontinhas
 Idanhense
 Marinhense
 Oleiros
 Peniche
 Praiense
 Sertanense
 Vitória de Sernache

Série E
 Belenenses
 Coruchense 
 Elvas
 Loures
 Rabo de Peixe
 Pêro Pinheiro
 Sacavenense
 Sintrense
 Sp. Ideal

Série F
 Barreirense
 Esperança de Lagos
 Imortal
 Juventude de Évora
 Louletano
 Moncarapachense
 Olhanense
 Pinhalnovense
 Serpa
 União Montemor

District Championships 

Algarve FA
 Ferreiras
 Culatrense
Angra do Heroísmo FA
 Graciosa
 Lusitânia dos Açores
Aveiro FA
 União de Lamas
 Estarreja
Beja FA
 Vasco da Gama da Vidigueira
 Penedo Gordo
Braga FA
 Ribeirão
 Joane
Bragança FA
 Rebordelo
 Vinhais

Castelo Branco FA
 Águias do Moradal
 Vila Velha de Ródão
Coimbra FA
 Ançã
 Vigor da Mocidade
Évora FA
 Estrela de Vendas Novas
 Lusitano de Évora
Guarda FA
 Guarda Desportiva
 Trancoso
Horta FA
none
Leiria FA
 Pombal
 Matamourisquense

Lisbon FA
 Damaiense
 Olivais e Moscavide
Madeira FA
 Machico
Ponta Delgada FA
 São Roque
 Vasco da Gama V.F. do Campo
Portalegre FA
 Arronches e Benfica
 Eléctrico
Porto FA
 Alpendorada
 Pedroso

Santarém FA
 Abrantes e Benfica
 Glória do Ribatejo
Setúbal FA
 Moitense
 Comércio e Indústria
Viana do Castelo FA
 Âncora Praia
 Valenciano
Vila Real FA
 Cerva
 Régua
Viseu FA
 Cinfães
 Moimenta da Beira

Schedule 
All draws are held at the Portuguese Football Federation (FPF) headquarters in Oeiras. Match kick-off times are in WET (UTC±0) from the third round to the semi-finals, and in WEST (UTC+1) during the rest of the competition. The schedule was published along with all national men competitions on 22 July 2021.

First round 
A total of 120 teams representing the Liga 3, Campeonato de Portugal and the District Championships were involved in the first round draw, which was held on 5 August 2021. Thirty-two teams received a bye to the second round and the remaining teams were split into eight series according to geographical proximity. These teams were then paired inside their serie, with the first team drawn playing at home.

Byes
The following thirty-two teams received a bye to the second round:

 Graciosa (5)
 Vitória de Setúbal (3)
 Anadia (3)
 Valadares (4)
 Olivais e Moscavide (5)
 Estrela de Vendas Novas (5)
 Belenenses (4)
 União de Leiria (3)

 Oleiros (4)
 Condeixa (4)
 Moitense (5)
 Pevidém (3)
 Vinhais (5)
 Torreense (3)
 Esperança de Lagos (4)
 Ferreira de Aves (4)

 Coruchense (4)
 Vilaverdense (4)
 Alpendorada (5)
 São João de Ver (3)
 Serpa (4)
 Pombal (5)
 Pêro Pinheiro (4)
 Rabo de Peixe (4)

 Rebordelo (5)
 União Montemor (4)
 Oliveira do Hospital (3)
 Ribeirão (5)
 São Roque (5)
 Fontinhas (4)
 União da Madeira (4)
 Cova da Piedade (3)

Matches

Second round

A total of 92 teams were involved in the second round draw, which was held on 15 September 2021.
The 16 teams from the Liga Portugal 2 joined the 44 winners from first round and the 32 teams that received a bye to the second round. All Liga Portugal 2 teams played this round as visitors.

Third round
A total of 64 teams were involved in the third round draw, which was held on 29 September 2021. The 18 teams from the Primeira Liga joined the 46 winners from second round. All Primeira Liga teams played this round as visitors.

Fourth round
A total of 32 teams were involved in the fourth round draw, which was held on 21 October 2021.

Fifth round 
A total of 16 teams were involved in the fifth round draw, which was held on 25 November 2021.

Quarter-finals 
The quarter-final pairings was decided on 27 December 2021.

Semi-finals 

Times were WET (UTC±0) in the first leg and WEST (UTC+1) in the second leg.

Porto won 3–1 on aggregate.

Tondela won 4–1 on aggregate.

Final

Bracket

Notes

References

External links 
 

2021–22
Portugal
2021–22 in Portuguese football